Everything Happens to Me is a 1996 compilation album by Frank Sinatra. The tracks were selected by Sinatra himself as his favorites and represent more of the tear-jerking "saloon songs" side of his catalog, including "The Gal That Got Away" and "Drinking Again", as well as nostalgic masterpieces "Summer Wind" and "Yesterday".

Track listing
 Medley: "The Gal That Got Away"/"It Never Entered My Mind" (Harold Arlen, Ira Gershwin)/(Richard Rodgers, Lorenz Hart) - 5:05
 "Everything Happens to Me" (Matt Dennis, Tom Adair) - 4:11
 "Once Upon a Time" (Charles Strouse, Lee Adams) - 3:30
 "Summer Wind" (Heinz Meyer, Hans Bradtke, Johnny Mercer) - 2:53
 "Once I Loved (O Amor en Paz)" (Antônio Carlos Jobim, Ray Gilbert, Vinícius de Moraes) - 2:37
 "If I Had You" (Jimmy Campbell, Reginald Connelly, Ted Shapiro) - 4:07
 "What Are You Doing the Rest of Your Life?" (Alan Bergman, Marilyn Bergman, Michel Legrand) - 4:05
 "The Second Time Around" (Sammy Cahn, Jimmy Van Heusen) - 3:03
 "I Hadn't Anyone Till You" (Ray Noble) - 3:44
 "Come Rain or Come Shine" (Arlen, Mercer) - 4:05
 "More Than You Know" (Billy Rose, Edward Eliscu, Vincent Youmans) - 3:22
 "If You Go Away" (Jacques Brel, Rod McKuen) - 3:30
 "Yesterday" (John Lennon, Paul McCartney) - 3:56
 "Drinking Again" (Mercer, Doris Tauber) - 3:13
 "I'll Only Miss Her When I Think Of Her" (Cahn, Van Heusen) - 2:50
 "How Insensitive" (Jobim, Norman Gimbel, de Moraes) - 3:15
 "Didn't We?" (Jimmy Webb) - 2:55
 "All My Tomorrows" (Cahn, Van Heusen) - 4:35
 "Put Your Dreams Away (For Another Day)" (Paul Mann, George David Weiss, Ruth Lowe) - 3:12

Personnel
 Frank Sinatra - vocals
 Antônio Carlos Jobim - vocals, guitar (tracks 5 and 16)
 Laurindo Almeida - guitar (track 15)
 Nelson Riddle - arranger, conductor
 Don Costa
 Gordon Jenkins
 Robert Farnon
 Claus Ogerman
 Torrie Zito

References

1996 compilation albums
Frank Sinatra compilation albums
Albums arranged by Nelson Riddle
Albums arranged by Don Costa
Albums arranged by Gordon Jenkins
Albums arranged by Claus Ogerman
Albums arranged by Torrie Zito